Bosselshausen is a commune in the Bas-Rhin department in Grand Est in north-eastern France.

In January, 2007, it split from the Kirrwiller commune after having merged with it in 1974.

See also
Communes of the Bas-Rhin department

References

Communes of Bas-Rhin
Bas-Rhin communes articles needing translation from French Wikipedia
Populated places established in 2007